These are the Billboard Hot 100 number one hits of 1983. The longest running number-one single of 1983 is "Every Breath You Take" by the Police at eight weeks.

That year, 9 acts reached number one for the first time: Toto, Patti Austin, James Ingram, Dexys Midnight Runners, Irene Cara, The Police, Eurythmics, Michael Sembello, and Bonnie Tyler. Michael Jackson was the only act to hit number one more than once, with three.

Chart history

Number-one artists

See also
1983 in music
List of Cash Box Top 100 number-one singles of 1983
List of Billboard number-one singles
List of number-one R&B singles of 1983 (U.S.)

References

Sources
Fred Bronson's Billboard Book of Number 1 Hits, 5th Edition
Joel Whitburn's Top Pop Singles 1955-2008, 12 Edition
Joel Whitburn Presents the Billboard Hot 100 Charts: The Eighties
Additional information obtained can be verified within Billboards online archive services and print editions of the magazine.

United States Hot 100
1983